Perotrochus maureri is a species of large sea snail, a marine gastropod mollusk in the family Pleurotomariidae, the slit snails.

Description
The length of the shell varies between 35 mm and 60 mm.

Distribution
This species occurs in the Atlantic Ocean off South Carolina and in the Gulf of Mexico off East Florida.

References

External links
 To Biodiversity Heritage Library (1 publication)
 To Encyclopedia of Life
 To GenBank (2 nucleotides; 0 proteins)
 To USNM Invertebrate Zoology Mollusca Collection
 To ITIS
 To World Register of Marine Species
 

Pleurotomariidae
Gastropods described in 1993